Gainesville, New York may refer to:

 Gainesville (town), New York, town in Wyoming County with population of >2,300
 Gainesville (village), New York, village in Wyoming County with population of ~300

See also
 Gainesville (disambiguation)